James Hegney (27 September 1891 – 5 May 1970) was an Australian politician who was a Labor Party member of the Legislative Assembly of Western Australia from 1930 to 1947 and again from 1950 to 1968. He served as Speaker of the Legislative Assembly from 1956 to 1959.

Early life
Hegney was born in Melbourne, as was his younger brother Bill Hegney (also a future MP). The brothers came to Western Australia as children, where their father worked for Western Australian Government Railways. After leaving school, Hegney worked as a boilermaker at the Midland Railway Workshops, and was a member of the Boilermakers' Union. He also played high-level Australian rules football, appearing in 23 games for the Midland Junction Football Club (a West Australian Football League club) between 1909 and 1910.

Politics
Hegney stood for parliament at the 1930 state election, and was elected to the new seat of Middle Swan. After the 1933 election, Hegney was appointed deputy chairman of committees in the Labor government. He remained in the role until the 1947 election, when he was narrowly defeated in his seat by Bill Grayden, the Liberal candidate. Hegney regained Middle Swan at the 1950 election, and after Labor's victory at the 1953 election was made chairman of committees in the Hawke government. He was elevated to the speakership after the 1956 election, replacing Aloysius Rodoreda, and remained speaker until the Labor government's defeat at the 1959 election. Hegney switched to the seat of Belmont at the 1962 election, and remained in parliament until retiring at the 1968 election.

See also
 Members of the Western Australian Legislative Assembly

References

1891 births
1970 deaths
Australian Labor Party members of the Parliament of Western Australia
Australian rules footballers from Western Australia
Australian sportsperson-politicians
Australian trade unionists
Members of the Western Australian Legislative Assembly
Midland Junction Football Club players
Speakers of the Western Australian Legislative Assembly
Politicians from Melbourne
20th-century Australian politicians